The Act of Uniformity (Explanation) Act 1663 (15 Car 2 c 6) was an Act of the Parliament of England.

The whole Act, except section 4 (which is section 5 in Ruffhead's Edition) and the last section, were repealed by section 1 of, and the Schedule to, the Statute Law Revision Act 1863.

The whole Act, so far as unrepealed, was repealed by section 1 of, and Part II of the Schedule to, the Statute Law (Repeals) Act 1969.

Section 4
This section, from "be it" to "aforesaid that" was repealed by section 1 of, and Part I of the Schedule to, the Statute Law Revision Act 1888.

See also
Act of Uniformity 1662

References
Halsbury's Statutes,

Acts of the Parliament of England
1663 in law
1663 in England